Nizhny Tashbukan (Tübänge Taşbükän) is a rural locality (a selo) and the administrative centre of Tashbukanovsky Selsoviet, Gafuriysky District, Bashkortostan, Russia. The population was 166 as of 2010. There are 4 streets.

Geography 
Nizhny Tashbukan is located 26 km southeast of Krasnousolsky (the district's administrative centre) by road. Verkhny Tashbukan is the nearest rural locality.

References 

Rural localities in Gafuriysky District